Lisa Roberts may refer to:

 Lisa Roberts (academic), professor of virology and Vice-Chancellor of the University of Exeter
 Lisa Roberts (politician), Canadian politician
 Lisa Roberts, bassist of the band Hole
 Elizabeth "Lisa" Roberts, American murder victim and formerly unidentified decedent.